Given two graphs  and , the maximum common edge subgraph problem is the problem of finding a graph  with as many  edges as possible which is isomorphic to both a subgraph of  and a subgraph of .

See also 
Maximum common subgraph isomorphism problem
Subgraph isomorphism problem
Induced subgraph isomorphism problem

References 

Computational problems in graph theory